The Austro-Hungarian Bank was the central bank of the Habsburg Monarchy in the 19th and early 20th centuries. 

The institution was founded in 1816 as the privilegirte oesterreichische National-Bank, and changed its name in 1878 as a delayed consequence of the Austro-Hungarian Compromise of 1867. It was liquidated in the financial turmoil folloiwng the collapse of the Habsburg Monarchy in late 1918, and was principally succeeded by the Oesterreichische Nationalbank in Vienna, the Hungarian National Bank in Budapest, and the National Bank of Czechoslovakia in Prague.

Background
It started issuing banknotes in 1762, which were known as "Bancozettel". During the Napoleonic Wars, the imperial Austrian government issued paper money of its own and rapidly increased its supply to finance the war effort, causing inflation.

Austrian Empire

Its shareholders were private individuals. Its first task was the redemption of the depreciated wartime paper money to re-establish trust in the currency. On , it was granted another imperial patent to issue money by printing banknotes, and had its first permanent staff by January 1818. It soon started developing its network of branches throughout the Austrian Empire. 

On , Emperor Ferdinand I renewed the Bank's issuance monopoly, and on that occasion altered its governance to increase government control. The Bank opened its first branch in Prague in 1847, and its second in Pest in 1851. The Bank's notes suffered depreciation during the successive episodes of financial stress associated with the revolutions of 1848–1849, the Autumn Crisis of 1850 with Prussia, and the Crimean War mobilization from 1853 to 1856. On , Emperor Franz Joseph I again renewed the Bank's issuance privilege, granted it greater independence, and emulated the UK Bank Charter Act 1844 by limiting the volume of banknotes in circulation to 200 million gulden backed with precious metal. In 1866, however, the Austrian government breached these arrangements to finance the Austro-Prussian War, and had to subsequently pay compensation to the Bank.

Austro-Hungarian Empire
The matter of the central bank and its governance was set aside during the negotiations that led to the Austro-Hungarian Compromise of 1867, with the understanding that it would be reformed in the future. Backed by these provisions, the Bank managed to preserve monetary stability during the Austrian financial boom-and-bust episode of 1873. By 1875, it had 24 branches outside of Vienna.

The adaptation of the bank's to the Monarchy's new political structure was only finalized in 1878, when its name was changed to Austro-Hungarian Bank. The bank was given a unitary governance with a general meeting and governing council chaired by a Governor, but a dual operating structure with two separate executive teams and head offices in Vienna and Budapest. The governor was to be jointly nominated by the respective ministers of finance of Austria and Hungary, and the bank was statutorily committed to opening new branches on an equitable basis in both parts of the Habsburg Monarchy. Hungarian nationalists were not satisfied by these arrangements and kept advocating for a separate Hungarian central bank, but their efforts remained unsuccessful until the end of the joint monarchy.

An 8-year transition from bimetallism to the gold standard, replacing the Austro-Hungarian gulden with the Austro-Hungarian krone, was completed in 1900. Even so, the Austro-Hungarian currency's gold parity was successfully maintained until 1914. During World War I, however, the Bank was unable to preserve monetary stability against the pressures of military expenses and economic shortages. The money supply increased thirteenfold, and prices rose sixteenfold compared to their prewar level. By late 1918, the real income of workers had been reduced to one fifth of what it had been in the last year of peace. About forty percent of the cost of war was covered by the central bank's monetary financing, and about sixty percent by war loans.

Dissolution

In Vienna, the Bank increasingly had recourse to monetary financing, and covered about 75 percent of the budget deficit of the new Republican Austrian state between 1918 and 1922. The Austrian currency depreciated sharply, from 16 to 30 kronen against the U.S. dollar during the first half of 1919 - and 5,275 kronen to the dollar by the end of 1921.

Governors

 Ádám Nemes von Hídvég ( – )
 Joseph Carl von Dietrichstein ( – )
 Melchior von Steiner (acting, 1825 – 1830)
  ( – )
 Carl Joseph Alois von Lederer ( – ; acting,  – )
 Franz Xaver Breyer von Breynau ( – early 1848)
 Josef Mayer von Gravenegg ( – )
 Joseph von Pipitz ( – )
 Alois Moser ( – )
 Gyula Kautz ( – )
 Leon Biliński ( – )
 Sándor Popovics ( – )
 Ignaz Gruber von Menninger ( – )
 Alexander Spitzmüller ( – December 1922)

Buildings

Vienna
At its creation, the Bank was temporarily settled at Singerstrasse 1 next to St. Stephen's Cathedral. Its pediment was adorned with sculptures by Josef Klieber, which were however removed when the building was repurposed in 1874.

In 1860, the Bank moved across the street to a new building complex designed in 1855 by architect Heinrich Ferstel, himself the son of a Nationalbank official, with ornate decoration including twelve statues by Hans Gasser representing the lands of the Austrian Empire. The complex also hosted the Wiener Börse (which only stayed there until 1869), a commercial mall, and from its opening in 1876, the famed Café Central. In 1897, the Bank expanded into the adjacent  on Freyung 1, where the Bank relocated its Austrian general management and the Governor's office. In 1924, in advance of its planned relocation, the Bank sold the entire complex to the Anglo-Austrian Bank, which redeveloped it for commercial use. The complex was comprehensively renovated in 1975–1982 and has been known since then as Palais Ferstel, including the recreation of the Café Central within the complex, albeit on a different location from the original.

In 1910, the Bank held a design competition for the design of a new head office in Vienna's Alsergrund district, which was won by Leopold Bauer, a disciple of celebrated Austrian architect Otto Wagner. Bauer's concept entailed a gigantic complex dominated by a massive 88-meter-high tower, partly on the location of the old Vienna General Hospital (later Campus Hof 1 of the University of Vienna). The construction of a first building intended for money printing facilities started in 1913 after demolition of the  barracks, but was disrupted by World War I and stopped in 1917; the rest of Bauer's grandiose development plan was never implemented. It was completed in 1925 to host the Oesterreichische Nationalbank, just weeks ahead of the introduction of the new currency, the Austrian schilling.

Budapest
The new Budapest head office building of the Austro-Hungarian Bank was inaugurated in 1905, and later hosted the Hungarian National Bank. Its interiors were much altered after World War II; a major renovation was undertaken in 2021, with the aim to reopen the building by the National Bank's 100th anniversary in 2024.

Branches
By 1914, the Austro-Hungarian Bank had 104 branches and 179 local offices throughout the Monarchy.

See also

 State Bank of the Russian Empire
 Imperial Ottoman Bank
 Reichsbank

Further reading

 Jobst, Clemens; Rieder, Kilian (2023). "Supervision without regulation: Discount limits at the Austro–Hungarian Bank, 1909–13". The Economic History Review.

References

Former central banks
Defunct banks of Austria